Sir Justin Hickey  (5 April 1920 – 21 August 2005) was an Australian businessman, insurance executive and philanthropist.

His father Simon Hickey was a New South Wales Labor politician.

Early life and education
Hickey was born in a working class suburb of Sydney, where he attended De La Salle College. He reportedly left school at the age of 14 to work in a factory.

Career
He became wealthy by founding Accident Insurance Mutual, which became Australia's largest privately owned insurer.

Lifestyle
He and his wife, Lady Barbara Hickey, owned Lady Barbara, a  superyacht built in 1983, now known as Emerald Lady. It was built for about $8 million in the 1980s and sold in 1998.

Hickey, a sailor and raconteur who staunchly supported the Australian National Party, told an ABC Four Corners program in 1982 that he was knighted after giving $100,000 towards the construction of a senior citizens' hospice in Sir Joh Bjelke-Petersen's electorate. Hickey replied to a question regarding the confluence of the contribution and the knighthood by saying "I paid the hundred thousand before I received the knighthood."

References

External links
 Courier Mail report

1920 births
2005 deaths
Australian people of Irish descent
Australian justices of the peace
Australian Knights Bachelor
People from Queensland
Businesspeople from Sydney
20th-century Australian businesspeople